Steffi Graf was the defending champion and won in the final 7–5, 6–2 against Andrea Temesvári.

Seeds
A champion seed is indicated in bold text while text in italics indicates the round in which that seed was eliminated.

  Steffi Graf (champion)
  Pam Shriver (second round)
  Jana Novotná (first round)
  Katerina Maleeva (second round)
  Hana Mandlíková (quarterfinals)
  Catarina Lindqvist (second round)
  Terry Phelps (second round)
  Sylvia Hanika (quarterfinals)

Draw

External links
 1989 United Jersey Bank Classic Draw

WTA New Jersey
1989 WTA Tour